Blangy-sur-Bresle (literally Blangy on Bresle) is a commune in the department of Seine-Maritime in the Normandy region of northern France.

Geography
Forestry, farming, and light industry are the main economic activities. The town lies on the D49 and the D928 roads close to junction 5 of the A29 motorway. Blangy-sur-Bresle station has rail connections to Beauvais and Le Tréport.

Heraldry

Population

Places of interest
 The church of Notre-Dame, dating from the thirteenth century.
 The Manoir de Fontaine (1607).
 The Manoir de Penthièvre (1636), built for la Grande Mademoiselle.
 The seventeenth century fulling mill at Hollande
 The Manoir de Grémontmesnil (1776).
 The mill at Hottineaux  1800).
 The remains of a medieval castle.
 Three museums.

Notable people
 Anne Marie Louise of Orléans (1627–1693), la Grande Mademoiselle.

See also
Communes of the Seine-Maritime department

References

Communes of Seine-Maritime